James F. Sullivan (1857–1917) was a United States Navy sailor and a recipient of the United States military's highest decoration, the Medal of Honor.

Biography
Born in 1857 in Lowell, Massachusetts, Sullivan joined the Navy from that state. By April 21, 1882, he was serving as a boatswain's mate on the training ship . On that day, while New Hampshire was at Newport, Rhode Island, he and another sailor, Chief Boatswain's Mate Jeremiah Troy, jumped overboard and rescued Third Class Boy Francis T. Price from drowning. For this action, both Sullivan and Troy were awarded the Medal of Honor two and a half years later, on October 18, 1884.

Sullivan's official Medal of Honor citation reads:
For jumping overboard from the U.S. Training Ship New Hampshire, at Newport, R.I., 21 April 1882, and rescuing from drowning Francis T. Price, third class boy.

See also

List of Medal of Honor recipients during peacetime

References

External links

1857 births
1917 deaths
People from Lowell, Massachusetts
United States Navy sailors
United States Navy Medal of Honor recipients
Non-combat recipients of the Medal of Honor
Military personnel from Massachusetts